The Spanish Ornithological Society (in Spanish: Sociedad Española de Ornitología; SEO/BirdLife) is Spain's main bird conservation charity. It was founded in 1954 and has 8,000 members and 50 staff. It is Spain's representative in the BirdLife International partnership.

The SEO has campaigned to get the central government to have all areas currently designated as Important Bird Areas to be given Special Protection Area status. It also collects  bird data and recently published the Atlas of Breeding Birds of Spain, which covers the whole country and all breeding species recorded. This work took four years a year of writing and editing.

It has censused Eurasian griffon vultures, campaigned against illegal poisoning of raptors and other predators, and worked on sustainable agriculture in the Ebro Delta.

Since 1998, SEO/BirdLife has also implemented an international programme in a North Africa and Latin America. The main focus as of 2008 is Morocco, carrying out different projects, mainly in wetlands. It is involved in monitoring the critically endangered northern bald ibis in its Moroccan stronghold in the Souss-Massa National Park.

References

Ornithological organizations
Organizations established in 1954
1954 establishments in Spain
Environmental organisations based in Spain
Bird conservation organizations
Animal welfare organisations based in Spain